Céline Banza (born on the 12th February 1997)  is a singer-songwriter and guitarist from the Democratic Republic of the Congo. She is the winner of the 2019 RFI Discoveries Music Award.

Career 
Banza was born in Kinshasa. She began her music career at a young age. In early 2010, she moved to Kisangani, where she met people who helped her develop a taste for music, dance, acting, and cinematography. At age  15, she returned to Kinshasa to study musicology at the National Institute of Arts where she met her band mates. In 2017, Banza made a brief appearance on The Voice Afrique Francophone. In the process, she created her own group, "Banza Musik", and participated the following year in the exhibition "Kinshasa 2050. women first! before devoting herself to her new musical project. In 2019, she performed at Jazz Kif in Kinshasa and Brazzaville. She won the 2019 edition of the RFI Discovery Awards She was chosen from among the ten finalists for the quality of her melodies and her voice. Asalfo, Charlotte Dipanda, Tiken Jah Fakoly, Fally Ipupa, Josey, Angélique Kidjo, Youssou N’Dour, Oumou Sangaré and Singuila were part of this jury. She released her first single "Te Rembi" in 2019 and her first album will be released in 2020.

Discography

Singles

Awards and nominations

See also 

 Asalfo
 Angélique Kidjo
 The Voice Afrique Francophone

References

External links 
Céline Banza on YouTube

1997 births
Living people
People from Kinshasa
21st-century Democratic Republic of the Congo women singers
Democratic Republic of the Congo songwriters
21st-century Democratic Republic of the Congo people